Lot 65 is a township in Queens County, Prince Edward Island, Canada.  It is part of Hillsboro Parish. Lot 65 was awarded to Richard Wright and Hugh Owens in the 1767 land lottery. In 1796, then-Lieutenant Governor Edmund Fanning granted Lot 65 to fellow Loyalist Andrew Ladner, with Louisa Augusta Fanning and Peter MacGowan as witnesses. Both Fanning and Ladner were Loyalist immigrants from the newly formed United States. Andrew Lander died in 1836 and is buried on the lot, in the location now known as Nine Mile Creek.

References

65
Geography of Queens County, Prince Edward Island